Min Se-hun (born 26 July 1963) is a South Korean athlete. He competed in the men's discus throw at the 1988 Summer Olympics.

References

1963 births
Living people
Athletes (track and field) at the 1988 Summer Olympics
South Korean male discus throwers
Olympic athletes of South Korea
Place of birth missing (living people)